Cantilevered stairs, or floating stairs, are a type of staircase.

A cantilever is a beam, which is anchored at only one end. Thus cantilevered stairs have a "floating" appearance, and they may be composed of different materials, such as wood, glass, stone, or stainless steel.

References

External links and references

 On installation of cantilever stairs
 International codes, relating to their construction
 Statistics on cantilever stairs
 What are floating stairs?

Stairs
Stairways
Pedestrian infrastructure